Marsh v. Chambers, 463 U.S. 783 (1983), was a landmark court case in which the Supreme Court of the United States held that government funding for chaplains was constitutional because of the "unique history" of the United States. Three days before the ratification of the First Amendment in 1791, containing the Establishment clause, the federal legislature authorized hiring a chaplain for opening sessions with prayer.

Background
Nebraska state senator Ernie Chambers sued in federal court claiming that the legislature's practice of opening sessions with a prayer offered by a state-supported chaplain was in violation of the Establishment Clause of the First Amendment.  The district court held that the prayer did not violate the Constitution, but that state support for the chaplain did.  The 8th Circuit Court of Appeals held that both practices violated the Constitution.

Question before the Court
Does paying a chaplain for religious services using taxpayer dollars violate the Establishment Clause of the First Amendment?

Decision of the Court
In a 6–3 decision in favor of Marsh, Chief Justice Burger wrote the opinion for the majority. The Chief Justice noted that the position of chaplain has been closely tied to the work of state and federal legislatures. "This unique history leads us to accept the interpretation of the First Amendment draftsmen who saw no real threat to the Establishment Clause arising from a practice of prayer similar to that now challenged."

Dissenting opinions
Justice Brennan, joined by Justice Marshall, wrote in a dissenting opinion,

The Court makes no pretense of subjecting Nebraska's practice of legislative prayer to any of the formal "tests" that have traditionally structured our inquiry under the Establishment Clause. That it fails to do so is, in a sense, a good thing, for it simply confirms that the Court is carving out an exception to the Establishment Clause, rather than reshaping Establishment Clause doctrine to accommodate legislative prayer. For my purposes, however, I must begin by demonstrating what should be obvious: that, if the Court were to judge legislative prayer through the unsentimental eye of our settled doctrine, it would have to strike it down as a clear violation of the Establishment Clause.

Citing Lemon v. Kurtzman (1971), Justice Brennan points out that the circumstances in the present case clearly do not meet the three-point Lemon test:

Every analysis in this area must begin with consideration of the cumulative criteria developed by the Court over many years. Three such tests may be gleaned from our cases. First, the statute [at issue] must have a secular legislative purpose; second, its principal or primary effect must be one that neither advances nor inhibits religion; finally, the statute must not foster "an excessive government entanglement with religion."

Justice Stevens also wrote a dissenting opinion, where he essentially argues that religious minorities of any particular region will be disenfranchised by the majority ruling, stating:

Prayers may be said by a Catholic priest in the Massachusetts Legislature and by a Presbyterian minister in the Nebraska Legislature, but I would not expect to find a Jehovah's Witness or a disciple of Mary Baker Eddy or the Reverend Moon serving as the official chaplain in any state legislature. Regardless of the motivation of the majority that exercises the power to appoint the chaplain, it seems plain to me that the designation of a member of one religious faith to serve as the sole official chaplain of a state legislature for a period of 16 years constitutes the preference of one faith over another in violation of the Establishment Clause of the First Amendment."

Subsequent history
In Town of Greece v. Galloway (2014) the Court held that the Establishment Clause is not violated when a town board begins their sessions with a sectarian prayer, so long as the town does not discriminate against minority faiths in determining who may offer a prayer.

See also
 List of United States Supreme Court cases, volume 463

References

External links

United States Supreme Court cases
United States Supreme Court cases of the Burger Court
Establishment Clause case law
1983 in United States case law
1983 in religion
Nebraska Legislature
American chaplains